Phaeomolis obnubila is a moth of the family Erebidae first described by Paul Dognin in 1923. It is found in Brazil.

References

Phaegopterina
Moths described in 1923